The 1984 Nehru Cup was the third edition of the Nehru Cup. It was held between 11 and 27 January 1984 in Calcutta.

Format
A total of 6 teams participated in the tournament through being invited by the All India Football Federation. The tournament would be played in a round-robin style with the top two in the final standings then meeting in a final match to crown the champions.

Matches

Final

Winners

External links
 Details at rsssf.com

1984
1984 in Indian sport
1984 in Chinese football
1984 in Argentine football
1983–84 in Indian football
1983–84 in Hungarian football
1984 in Asian football